The State Register of Heritage Places is maintained by the Heritage Council of Western Australia. , 19 places are heritage-listed in the Shire of Upper Gascoyne, of which one is on the State Register of Heritage Places, the Upper Gascoyne Road Board Office in Gascoyne Junction.

List

State Register of Heritage Places
The Western Australian State Register of Heritage Places, lists the following state registered places within the Shire of Upper Gascoyne:

Shire of Upper Gascoyne heritage-listed places
The following places are heritage listed in the Shire of Upper Gascoyne but are not State registered:

References

Upper
Shire of Upper Gascoyne